The elections for the 14th vice president of India was held on 6 August 2022. The announcement was made by the Election Commission of India. Article 67 of the Constitution of India provides that the Vice President of India shall remain in office for a period of five years. The winner of this election is Jagdeep Dhankhar who replaced Venkaiah Naidu as Vice President on 11 August 2022. On 16 July 2022, Jagdeep Dhankhar the then serving Governor of West Bengal was nominated as a vice-presidential candidate by the BJP. On 17 July 2022, Margaret Alva was announced as the vice-presidential candidate by the United Progressive Alliance and some non-UPA Parties. Hence,  Jagdeep Dhankhar won the election by 528 votes defeating the United Opposition candidate Margaret Alva.

Electoral system 
The Vice President is elected by an electoral college which includes members of the Rajya Sabha and of the Lok Sabha. The nominated members of the mentioned houses are also eligible to vote in the election process. Voting is done by secret ballot.

Election schedule 
Under sub-section (1) of Section (4) of the Presidential and Vice-Presidential Elections Act 1952, the schedule for the election of the Vice President of India had been announced by the Election Commission of India on 29 June 2022.

Electoral college

 Jammu and Kashmir Legislative Assembly was dissolved and President's rule had been imposed. All 4 Rajya Sabha seats of Jammu and Kashmir are vacant.
 The only Rajya Sabha seat of Tripura is also vacant.
 3 nominated member seats in the Rajya Sabha are also vacant.

Candidates

National Democratic Alliance

United Opposition (India)

Results
  

|- align=center
!style="background-color:#E9E9E9" class="unsortable"|
!style="background-color:#E9E9E9" align=center|Candidate
!style="background-color:#E9E9E9" |Party 
!style="background-color:#E9E9E9" |Electoral Votes
!style="background-color:#E9E9E9" |% of Votes
|-
| 
|align="left"|Jagdeep Dhankhar||align="left"|BJP || 528|| 74.37
|-
| 
|align="left"|Margaret Alva||align="left"|INC ||182 || 25.63
|-
| colspan="5" style="background:#e9e9e9;"|
|-
! colspan="3" style="text-align:left;"| Total
! style="text-align:right;"| 710
! style="text-align:right;"| 100
|-
| colspan="5" style="background:#e9e9e9;"| 
|-
|-
|colspan="3" style="text-align:left;"|Valid Votes||710 ||
|-
|colspan="3" style="text-align:left;"|Invalid Votes||15 ||
|-
|colspan="3" style="text-align:left;"|Turnout|| 725||92.95%
|-
|colspan="3" style="text-align:left;"|Abstentions||55 ||7.05%
|-
|colspan="3" style="text-align:left;"|Electors|| 780|| style="background:#e9e9e9;"|
|-
|}

See also
 2022 elections in India
 2022 Indian presidential election
 List of Indian vice presidential elections
 List of vice presidents of India

References

 
August 2022 events in India
Vice-presidential elections in India